Aldo Ceccato (born 18 February 1934) is an Italian conductor.

Ceccato was born in Milan.  He worked as assistant to Sergiu Celibidache and was music director of the Detroit Symphony Orchestra from 1973 until 1977. Then, from 1976 until 1982, he was music director of the Hamburg Philharmonic. He was also music director of the Bergen Philharmonic Orchestra from 1985 until 1990. He is the son-in-law of conductor Victor de Sabata and has made a recording of de Sabata's compositions for the Hyperion record label.  In 1971, he recorded Donizetti's Maria Stuarda and Verdi's La traviata, both with Beverly Sills.

References

1934 births
Italian male conductors (music)
Living people
Musicians from Milan
21st-century Italian conductors (music)
21st-century Italian male musicians